178P/Hug–Bell is a periodic comet in the Solar System. It was discovered by Northeast Kansas Amateur Astronomers' League members Gary Hug and Graham Bell and is thought to be the first periodic comet to be discovered by amateurs. It was declared a comet less than two days after its initial discovery, after having its course confirmed on previous images.

Hug-Bell's orbital period is about seven years; its orbit is eccentric, though less so than many comets. Hug-Bell's orbit lies entirely outside the orbit of Mars, but at its aphelion overlaps in solar distance with the orbit of Jupiter. Because it never comes closer to the Sun than about 2 AU, it is never expected to be a very bright comet, with a typical perihelion magnitude of 18-19.

References

External links 
 Orbital simulation from JPL (Java) / Horizons Ephemeris
 178P/Hug-Bell – Seiichi Yoshida @ aerith.net
 178P/Hug-Bell @ JPL Small-Body Database Browser

Periodic comets
0178